The People's National Convention is a political party in Ghana. After constitutional rule was restored back in Ghana in 1992 the party was formed by former President Hilla Limann based on ideals from the People's National Party which he led in the 1979 elections and won.

Electoral performance

1992 Elections 
The PNC has contested all national elections since the inception of the fourth republic apart from the 1992 parliamentary election, which was boycotted along with other opposition parties.

2004 Elections 
At the elections held on 7 December 2004, the party was part of the Grand Coalition, which won four out of 230 seats. Edward Mahama, candidate of the Grand Coalition, won 1.9% of the vote at the presidential elections.

2008 Elections 
At the December 2008 elections, the party won two seats in Parliament. For the fourth time in a row, Edward Mahama was the presidential candidate. He received 0.8% of the vote.

2012 Elections 
Hassan Ayariga was elected in 2011 by the party to stand in the 2012 presidential election. Ayariga received 0.22% of the vote.

2016 Elections 
The party elected new officials in 2015, with Edward Mahama becoming its presidential candidate and General Secretary Bernard Mornah becoming the chairman. The new National Treasurer is now Akane Adams who is taken over from his predecessor David Apasera, a former member of Parliament for Bolga Central. Hassan Ayariga who led the party in the 2012 elections quit the party after losing to Edward Mahama and decided to start his own party All People's Congress.

Parliamentary elections

Presidential elections

References

External links

1992 establishments in Ghana
Nkrumaist political parties
Pan-Africanism in Ghana
Pan-Africanist political parties in Africa
Political parties established in 1992
Political parties in Ghana
Socialist parties in Ghana